Tony László (born 16 October 1960) is an American born to parents of Hungarian and Italian descent. He was raised in the United States and came to Japan in 1985. As a freelance journalist, he has written articles in English and Japanese.

He has been a representative and webmaster for the non-governmental organization Issho Kikaku since 1994.

He is married to manga artist Saori Oguri and appears as a leading character in some of her works, mainly the My Darling is a Foreigner (Darling wa Gaikokujin) series.

His own writings include the book , which his wife illustrated.

References

External links
 

1960 births
Living people
American male journalists
American people of Hungarian descent
American people of Italian descent
American expatriates in Japan